Poppin' is an album by jazz saxophonist Hank Mobley first released on Blue Note Japan in 1980 as GXF 3066 (the BN catalogue number is 1620). It was recorded on October 20, 1957 and features Mobley, trumpeter Art Farmer, baritone saxophonist  Pepper Adams, pianist Sonny Clark, bassist Paul Chambers, and drummer  “Philly” Joe Jones.

Reception
The Allmusic review by Stephen Thomas Erlewine awarded the album 4 stars stating "All of the musicians turn in fine performances (Clark in particular stands out with his lithe solos and tasteful accompaniment), and the result is a winning collection of straight-ahead hard bop that ranks as another solid addition to Mobley's strong catalog.".

Track listing 
All compositions by Hank Mobley except as indicated

 "Poppin'" - 6:33
 "Darn That Dream" (DeLange, VanHeusen) - 6:10
 "Gettin' into Something" - 6:33
 "Tune-Up" (Davis) - 10:53
 "East of Brooklyn" - 10:09

Personnel 
 Hank Mobley - tenor saxophone
 Art Farmer - trumpet
 Pepper Adams - baritone saxophone
 Sonny Clark - piano
 Paul Chambers - bass
 Philly Joe Jones - drums

References 

1980 albums
Albums produced by Alfred Lion
Albums recorded at Van Gelder Studio
Blue Note Records albums
Hank Mobley albums
Hard bop albums